Benjamin Thomas Davies (born 24 April 1993) is a Welsh professional footballer who plays as a left-back and central defender for  club Tottenham Hotspur and the Wales national team.

Davies is an academy graduate of Swansea City, a Welsh club based in Swansea who play in the English football league system, also joining Danish club Viborg FF's academy while his family lived in Denmark. He made his professional debut for Swansea City in the second Premier League game of the 2012–13 season against West Ham United, scoring his first professional goal in a 3–1 Premier League win against Stoke City in January 2013. In the 2013–14 season, Davies was once again a regular for Swansea City.

In July 2014, Davies was signed by Tottenham Hotspur for an undisclosed fee, making his debut for Tottenham in a Europa League game against Cypriot side AEL Limassol. During Mauricio Pochettino's tenure, Davies battled Danny Rose for the starting left-back spot, but Davies was redeployed as a left-sided centre-back in a defensive back three by Antonio Conte.

Davies made three appearances for the Welsh national U-19 football team in his youth. His appearances all came as part of qualification for the 2012 UEFA European Under-19 Championship. Davies made his debut senior Welsh national team against Scotland at the 2014 FIFA World Cup qualification in 2012. He has since made over 70 senior appearances for Wales, and represented the side at UEFA Euro 2016, reaching the semi-finals, and UEFA Euro 2020. Davies also helped Wales qualify for the FIFA World Cup in 2022, the last time was in 1958.

Early life
Davies was born in Neath, West Glamorgan. After spending time in the youth academy at Swansea City, he and his family moved to Viborg, Denmark, after his father accepted a job offer. They spent three years living in Denmark, where he played for Viborg FF's youth team before returning to Swansea. Davies attended Ysgol Gyfun Ystalyfera and he is a fluent Welsh language speaker.

Club career

Swansea City
After spending time with the youth ranks, Davies signed a two-year contract with Swansea City, making his first-team debut against West Ham United for the Premier League on 25 August 2012, coming on as an 84th minute substitute for Neil Taylor in a 3–0 home win.

Davies became a regular starter for Swansea in the 2012–13 season, following a long-term injury to Taylor.

On 23 November 2012, Davies signed a new three-and-a-half-year contract with Swansea.

On 19 January 2013, Davies scored his first goal for Swansea against Stoke City in a 3–1 victory. In doing so, at 19 years and 270 days, he became Swansea's youngest scorer in the Premier League. In September 2013, he scored his second and third Premier League goals for Swansea, against West Brom and Arsenal respectively.

On 24 December 2013, Davies signed a one-year contract extension, keeping him at Swansea until June 2017.

Tottenham Hotspur

On 23 July 2014, Davies joined Tottenham Hotspur on a five-year contract for an undisclosed fee. He joined on the same day as his Swansea teammate Michel Vorm, with Gylfi Sigurðsson being exchanged as part of the deal. Davies made his Premier League debut for Tottenham Hotspur as a late substitute in a 0–3 defeat to Liverpool. He made his first start for the club in the league in a 2–1 away win at Hull City on 23 November 2014. He was an unused substitute for the 2015 League Cup Final at Wembley Stadium on 1 March 2015, in which Tottenham were beaten 2–0 by Chelsea.

Davies scored his first goal for the club on 8 January 2017, a header in an FA Cup tie against Aston Villa. He signed a new four-year contract at Tottenham on 9 March 2017, extending his deal to 2021.

Davies scored his second Tottenham goal – and his first for them in the Premier League – against Hull City on the final day of the 2016–17 season; a first-time strike from outside the box into the top left corner added a sixth goal in an eventual 7–1 win for Tottenham.

Davies started for Tottenham in the opening match of the 2017–18 season, and scored a goal in a 2–0 win away to Newcastle United.

Davies signed a new 5-year contract with Tottenham in July 2019.

Davies scored his first goal of the 2020–21 season, his first in over three years, in the Carabao Cup tie against Stoke City, helping the team win 3–1 to reach the semi-finals.

At the start of the 2021–22 season, Davies started only one Premier League game during Nuno Espírito Santo's brief tenure as head coach. He has been a regular starter since Antonio Conte was hired as head coach in November 2021, where he has been redeployed as a left-sided centre-back as part of a defensive back three, the same role he tends to play for the Wales national team.

Davies scored his first goal of the 2022–23 season in a league match against Bournemouth on 29 October, an equaliser in an eventual 3–2 comeback victory. For Tottenham's 2-0 victory against West Ham on 19 February 2023, Davies was deployed in his old position of left wing-back; he assisted Emerson Royal for the opening goal, and described the attacking role as "fun".

International career
In September 2012, Davies was selected for the Wales squad for 2014 FIFA World Cup qualification matches in September 2012. He replaced club teammate Neil Taylor, who had suffered a broken ankle in a Premier League match against Sunderland. Davies made his full international debut in the 2–1 win against Scotland on 12 October 2012. In May 2021 he was selected for the Wales squad for the delayed UEFA Euro 2020 tournament. In November 2022 he was named in the Wales squad for the 2022 FIFA World Cup in Qatar.

Outside football 
In the summer of 2021, Davies was awarded a 2:1 degree in Economics and Business from the Open University, after balancing his studies with his job as a professional footballer over a period of five years.

Career statistics

Club

International

As of match played 29 November 2022. Wales' score listed first, score column indicates score after each Davies goal.

Honours
Swansea City
Football League Cup: 2012–13

Tottenham Hotspur
Football League Cup runner-up: 2014–15
UEFA Champions League runner-up: 2018–19

References

External links

Profile at the Tottenham Hotspur F.C. website

1993 births
Living people
Footballers from Neath
Welsh footballers
Wales youth international footballers
Wales international footballers
Association football defenders
Swansea City A.F.C. players
Tottenham Hotspur F.C. players
Premier League players
UEFA Euro 2016 players
UEFA Euro 2020 players
2022 FIFA World Cup players
People educated at Ysgol Gyfun Ystalyfera